Villa La Florida is a town in Buenos Aires Province, Argentina. It is located in the Quilmes Partido in the south of the Greater Buenos Aires agglomeration.

External links

Populated places in Buenos Aires Province
Populated places established in 1926
Quilmes Partido